Pidyon Shvuyim (literally: Redemption of Captives) is a religious duty in Judaism to bring about the release of a fellow Jew captured by slave dealers or robbers, or imprisoned unjustly by the authorities. The release of the prisoner is typically secured by a ransom paid by the Jewish community. It is considered an important commandment in Jewish law.

Sources
The Talmud calls pidyon shvuyim a “mitzvah rabbah”, a great mitzvah, as captivity is viewed as even worse than starvation and death (Bava Batra 8b).

Maimonides writes: “The redeeming of captives takes precedence over supporting the poor or clothing them. There is no greater mitzvah than redeeming captives for the problems of the captive include being hungry, thirsty, unclothed, and they are in danger of their lives too. Ignoring the need to redeem captives goes against these Torah laws: “Do not harden your heart or shut your hand against your needy fellow” (Devarim 15:7); “Do not stand idly by while your neighbor’s blood is shed” (Vayikra 19:16). And misses out on the following mitzvot: “You must surely open your hand to him or her” (Devarim 15:8); “...Love your neighbor as yourself” (Vayikra 19:18); “Rescue those who are drawn to death” (Proverbs 24:11) and "... there is no mitzvah greater than the redeeming of captives.” (Maimonides, Mishneh Torah, Hilchot Matanot Aniyim 8:10-11)

The Shulchan Aruch adds: “Every moment that one delays in freeing captives, in cases where it is possible to expedite their freedom, is considered to be tantamount to murder.” (Shulchan Aruch, Yoreh De'ah 252:3)

Limitations in the practice of the mitzvah 
Despite the importance of the Mitzvah, it should be performed within a number of boundaries, the most significant of which is:

“One does not ransom captives for more than their value because of Tikkun Olam (literally: “fixing the world”; for the good order of the world; as a precaution for the general good) and one does not help captives escape because of Tikkun Olam." (Mishna, Gittin 4:6)

One of the aims of this restriction is to avoid encouraging kidnappers, or those seeking financial gain by capturing Jews and demanding a Kofer (a ransom) in exchange, due to the knowledge of how sensitive Jews are to rescuing their prisoners at any price. There are certain instances in which this restriction does not apply, such as when a man wishes to pay an excessive sum for his freedom, or when the prisoner is a Talmid Chacham, or when a husband is attempting to earn the freedom of his wife (Shulchan Aruch, Yoreh De'ah 252:4).

A prominent example of the practice of this restriction in reality was the affair of the arrest of Rabbi Meir of Rothenburg, a Gadol of Ashkenazi Jewry in the 13th century, who is said to have forbidden his pidyon from prison citing the aforementioned restriction, despite the fact that according to the Halakha it was permitted to pay a substantial sum for his release.

Another restriction is that if a person repeatedly causes his own capture time after time, a pidyon is no longer required after the third time. This refers to a situation in which a person has sold himself, or has been taken to prison due to a crime committed intentionally. This restriction only applies when the life of the captive is not in danger; if his captors desire to kill him, a pidyon is mandatory.

Present 
The question of Pidyon Shvuyim, and particularly the amount of ransom to be paid, is a controversial issue in Israel, when captured Israeli soldiers are to be liberated or exchanged for Palestinian prisoners.

In April 2010, several American and Canadian haredi rabbis from different Jewish sects released a public pronouncement (Kol Kore), asking for Pidyon Shvuyim on behalf of former kosher meat plant Agriprocessors′ top manager Sholom Rubashkin, a Lubavitcher Hasid, awaiting sentencing after being convicted on 86 charges of financial fraud in November 2009 by a federal court in Iowa, U.S.

References

External links
Pidyon Shvuyim (The Redemption of Captives) & Gilad Shalit: How Far Should Israel Go in Order to Redeem Captive Soldiers from Terrorist Organizations?, Jewish Virtual Library
Samuel G. Freedman, A Mitzvah Behind the Price of a Soldier’s Freedom, New York Times, October 21, 2011

Jewish law
Positive Mitzvoth
Judaism and slavery
Ransom